The Indian subcontinent has a long history of education and learning from the era of Indus Valley civilization. Important ancient institutions of learning in ancient India are Takshashila,  Kashmir Smast, Nalanda, Valabhi University, Sharada Peeth, Pushpagiri Vihara, Odantapuri University, Vikramashila, Somapura Mahavihara, Bikrampur Vihara, Jagaddala Mahavihara.

Takshashila 
The University of ancient Taxila was a renowned Hindu ancient institute of higher-learning located in the city of Taxila. 
According to scattered references that were only fixed a millennium later, it may have dated back to at least the fifth century BC. Some scholars date Takshashila's existence back to the sixth century BC. The school consisted of several monasteries without large dormitories or lecture halls where the religious instruction was most likely still provided on an individualistic basis.

Takshashila is described in some detail in later Jātaka tales, written in Sri Lanka around the fifth century AD.

It became a noted centre of learning at least several centuries BC, and continued to attract students until the destruction of the city in the fifth century AD.

Important Teachers 
Important teachers that are said to be teaching at university of Taxila include;

 Pāṇini, the great 5th century BCE Indian grammarian Pāṇini is said to have been born in Shalatula near Attock, not far from Taxila. This region was then part of Gandāra satrapy of the Achaemenid Empire, but the ethnicity in his name or the way of his life shows that he was of Indian origin. He is likely to have been teaching at Taxila university.
 Chanakya, the influential Prime Minister of the founder of the Mauryan Empire, Chandragupta Maurya, is also said to have been teaching at Taxila.
 Kumāralāta, according to the 3rd century Chinese Buddhist monk and traveller Yuan Chwang, Kumāralāta, the founder of Sautrāntika school was also an excellent teacher at Taxila university and attracted pupil from as far as China.
 Vasubandhu, the founder of Tibetan Buddhism is said to be teaching there. His famous pupil includes Dharmakirti and Dignaga.

Important Students 
Important pupil from ancient University of Taxila includes;

 King Pasenadi of Kosala, a close friend of the Buddha
 Bandhula, the commander of Pasedani's army
 Aṅgulimāla, a close follower of the Buddha. A Buddhist story about Aṅgulimāla (also called Ahiṃsaka, and later a close follower of Buddha), relates how his parents send him to Taxila to study under a well-known teacher. There he excels in his studies and becomes the teacher's favorite student, enjoying special privileges in his teacher's house. However, the other students grow jealous of Ahiṃsaka's speedy progress and seek to turn his master against him. To that end, they make it seem as though Ahiṃsaka has seduced the master's wife.
 Jivaka, court doctor at Rajagriha and personal doctor of the Buddha.
 Charaka, the Indian "father of medicine" and one of the leading authorities in Ayurveda, is also said to have studied at Taxila, and practiced there.
 Chandragupta Maurya, Buddhist literature states that Chandragupta Maurya, the future founder of the Mauryan Empire, though born near Patna (Bihar) in Magadha, was taken by Chanakya for his training and education to Taxila, and had him educated there in "all the sciences and arts" of the period, including military sciences. There he studied for eight years. The Greek and Hindu texts also state that Kautilya (Chanakya) was a native of the northwest Indian subcontinent, and Chandragupta was his resident student for eight years. These accounts match Plutarch's assertion that Alexander the Great met with the young Chandragupta while campaigning in the Punjab.

Nalanda

Nalanda (Sanskrit: नालंंदा) was an ancient Mahavihara, a revered Buddhist monastery which also served as a renowned centre of learning, in the ancient kingdom of Magadha (modern-day Bihar) in India. The university of Nalanda obtained significant fame, prestige and relevance during ancient times, and rose to legendary status due to its contribution to the emergence of India as a great power around the fourth century. Today, it is a UNESCO World Heritage Site.

Mithila University 
University of Mithila was famous for Nyaya Sutra and logical Sciences. It was gradually started from the philosophical conferences held by Janaka, the king of Mithila at his court. These philosophical conferences led to the formation of a seat of learning and this seat of learning converted into the university of Mithila.

Valabhi University
The Valabhi University was an important centre of Buddhist learning and championed the cause of Hinayana Buddhism between 600 CE and 1200 CE. Valabhi was the capital of the Maitraka empire during the period 480-775 CE. It was an important port for international trade located in Saurashtra, present day it is called Vallabhipur  located in Bhavnagar district of Gujarat in western India, identical with the old state of Vala. For some time, the university was considered to be a rival to Nalanda, in Bihar, in the field of education. In September 2017, the Indian central government started to consider a proposal to revive the ancient university's all things even the university.

Sharada Peeth 
Sharada Peeth is a ruined Hindu temple and ancient centre of learning located in present-day Pakistan-administered Jammu and Kashmir. Between the 6th and 12th centuries CE, it was among the most prominent temple universities in the Indian subcontinent. Known in particular for its library, stories recount scholars travelling long distances to access its texts. It played a key role in the development and popularisation of the Sharada script in North India.

Library at Sharada Peeth 
Sharada Peeth was also valued by scholars across the Indian subcontinent for its library, and stories detail long journeys they would take to consult it.

 In the 11th century, the Vaishnava saint Swami Ramanuja traveled from Srirangam to Sharada Peeth to refer to the Brahma Sutras, before commencing work on writing his commentary on the Brahma sutras, the Sri Bhasya.

 The 13th century CE (1277 – 78) text Prabhāvakacarita contains a story of the Śvētāmbara scholar Hemachandra. As Sharada Peeth was the only place with a library known to have all such works available in their complete form, Hemachandra requested King Jayasimha Siddharaja to send a team to retrieve copies of the existing eight Sanskrit grammatical texts preserved there. These supported his own text of Sanskrit grammar, the Siddha-Hema-Śabdanuśāśana.

Important Students 
The important pupil who studied here include:

 
 Thonmi Sambhota (7th century CE) was sent on a mission to Kashmir to procure an alphabet for the Tibetan language. There, he learned various scripts and grammar treatises from learned pandits, and then devised a script for Tibetan based largely on the Sharada alphabet.
 
 Rinchen Zangpo, a principal lotsawa or translator of Sanskrit Buddhist texts into Tibetan, is also said to be studied here.
 
 The Kashmiri historian Kalhana Pandit
 Hindu philosopher Adi Shankara.

Pushpagiri Vihara
Pushpagiri (Odia: ପୁଷ୍ପଗିରି) was an ancient Buddhist mahavihara or monastic complex located atop Langudi Hill (or Hills) in Jajpur district of Odisha, India. Pushpagiri was mentioned in the writings of the Chinese traveller Xuanzang and some other ancient sources. Until the 1990s, it was hypothesised to be one or all of the Lalitgiri-Ratnagiri-Udayagiri group of monastic sites, also located in Jajpur district. These sites contain ruins of many buildings, stupas of various sizes, sculptures (many now removed to museums), and other artifacts.

However, archaeological excavations conducted at Langudi Hills during 1996-2006 resulted in the discovery of another site, with inscriptions describing the local monastery as puṣpa sabhar giriya, and identified by the excavators as Pushpagiri. This has now become the general view among scholars.  The site has now been made accessible for tourism.

The visit of Xuanzang indicates that Pushpagiri was an important Buddhist site in ancient India. Along with Nalanda, Vikramashila, Odantapuri, Takshashila and Vallabhi, it is believed to be a major ancient centre of learning. It flourished between 3rd and 11th centuries CE.

Odantapuri University
Odantapuri (also called Odantapura or Uddandapura) was a prominent Buddhist Mahavihara in what is now Bihar, India. It is believed to have been established by Gopala I in the 8th century. It is considered the second oldest of India's Mahaviharas after Nalanda University and was situated in Magadha.

Vikramashila
Vikramashila (Sanskrit: विक्रमशिला) was one of the two most important centres of learning in India during the Pala Empire, along with Nalanda. Its location is now the site of Antichak village, Bhagalpur district in Bihar.

Vikramashila was established by the Pala emperor Dharmapala (783 to 820 AD) in response to a supposed decline in the quality of scholarship at Nalanda. Atiśa, the renowned pandita, is sometimes listed as a notable abbot. It was destroyed by the forces of Muhammad bin Bakhtiyar Khalji around 1193.

Somapura Mahavihara
Somapura Mahavihara in Paharpur, Badalgachhi Upazila, Naogaon District, Bangladesh is among the best known viharas, monasteries, in the Indian subcontinent and is one of the most important archaeological sites in the country. It is also one of the earliest sites of Bengal, where significant numbers of Hindu statues were found. It was designated as a UNESCO World Heritage Site in 1985. It is one of the most famous examples of architecture in pre-Islamic Bangladesh. It dates from a period to the nearby Halud Vihara and to the Sitakot Vihara in Nawabganj Upazila of Dinajpur District.

Bikrampur Vihara
Bikrampur Vihara is an ancient Buddhist vihara at Raghurampur village, Bikrampur, Munshiganj District in Bangladesh.

Jagaddala Mahavihara
Jagaddala Mahavihara (fl. late 11th century - mid-12th century) was a Buddhist monastery and seat of learning in Varendra, a geographical unit in present north Bengal in Bangladesh.  It was founded by the later kings of the Pāla dynasty, probably Ramapala (c. 1077–1120), most likely at a site near the present village of Jagdal in Dhamoirhat Upazila in the north-west Bangladesh on the border with India,  near Paharapur.  Some texts also spell the name Jaggadala.

Other 
Further centres include Telhara in Bihar (probably older than Nalanda), Kanchipuram, in Tamil Nadu, Manyakheta, in Karnataka, Nagarjunakonda, in Andhra Pradesh, Varanasi in Uttar Pradesh (eighth century to modern times),Abhayagiri Vihāra, and Jetavanaramaya, in Sri Lanka.

See also
Indus Valley civilization
Hinduism
Buddhism
Jainism

References

History of South Asia
Education in Pakistan
Education in India
Education in Bangladesh
Education in Nepal